The Izmir trolleybus system formed part of the public transport network in the city of Izmir, Turkey, from 1954 to 1992.  Operated by ESHOT, the system was one of four trolleybus systems to have existed in Turkey, along with ones in Ankara, Istanbul, and Malayta. Prior to the opening of the Malatya system, in 2015, the Izmir system had been the last surviving trolleybus system in Turkey at the time of its closure in 1992. Trolleybuses operated mainly in Konak, with lines to Buca, Balçova and Tepecik.

History
Trolleybuses replaced the declining tramways of İzmir. The first trolleybuses, built by MAN, arrived in Izmir on May 14, 1954, on a ship from Germany. The first trolleybus line opened on July 28, 1954, or August 16, 1954, between Konak and Güzelyalı.  The original fleet totalled eighteen vehicles, MAN trolleybuses (model MKE 3) with Rathgeber bodies, numbered 1–18.  The fleet was expanded in 1957 with a purchase of 20 Fiat 2411F trolleybuses, numbered 19–38.

The Izmir system was the only Turkish trolleybus system ever to use articulated trolleybuses, but it had only three such vehicles, total.  They were built by  Fiat/Viberti in 1958 and were numbered 39–41. ESHOT never acquired any more articulated trolleybuses.  In the 1960s, the high cost of importing new trolleybuses led the company to convert a batch of Büssing motorbuses into trolleybuses.  There were three such conversions in 1962, numbered 42 and 44–45, and 18 more in 1968, numbered 46–63.

After the closure of the Istanbul trolleybus system, in 1984, Izmir acquired most of its trolleybuses. These were built in 1962 by Alfa Romeo-Fiat, and a total of 75 were acquired secondhand from Istanbul. This was the last fleet of trolleybuses to enter service in Izmir.  As of mid-1989, the active trolleybus fleet included 19 of the 1957 Fiat 2411F vehicles, all three of the 1958 Viberti-bodied Fiat articulated vehicles, one 1959 Fiat 2411F (No. 43), and 67 ex-Istanbul Alfa Romeo-Fiat vehicles built in 1962.  The last of the MAN trolleybuses that opened the system were retired in 1987 and the last Büssing vehicles in 1988 or 1989.

Route 3 was withdrawn on June 9, 1989, leaving four routes still operating:  1, 2, 70 and 80.

With its fleet falling apart, ESHOT discontinued trolleybus service in 1992, with different sources giving the date as either March 6, 1992, or September 1992.

Routes

10 Gümrük–Alsancak - Line later became Route 1.
11 Fahrettin Altay–Alsancak - Line later became Route 2.
12 Fahrettin Altay–Lausanne Square
21 Fahrettin Altay–Montrö
30 Fahrettin Altay–Tepecik - Line later became Route 4.
40 Fahrettin Altay–Kahramanlar - Line later became Route 3.
50 Hatay-Montrö - Line later became Route 86.
70 Montrö–Buca
Fuar Line - A line that circled the International Fairgrounds.

See also
 List of trolleybus systems
 Transport in İzmir

References

Izmir
Transport in İzmir
Izmir